Raffaella Masciadri (born September 30, 1980) is an Italian basketball player for PF Schio and the Italian national team.

She participated at the EuroBasket Women 2017.

References

1980 births
Living people
Italian women's basketball players
Sportspeople from Como
Small forwards